Womersley railway station was a railway station in North Yorkshire, England. It was situated on the Askern Branch Line and was built by the Lancashire & Yorkshire Railway to provide at link to the great Northern Railway at Doncaster. It was opened in 1848and closed to passenger traffic back in September 1948. The platforms have since been demolished, but the railway line through the site is still open and in regular use. The grand presence and noticeable architecture of the station likely resulted from the Lancashire and Yorkshire Railways’ belief that it was in keeping with what was an estate village location. 

The estate at the time of construction in the 1840's belonged to Lord Roche and there were many important visitors to the estate who came by train including the Queen Mother. The branch line through Womersley was also very popular with visitors to the nearby spa town of Askern.

The site today
The station house still exists, next to the level crossing. Trains mainly operate to the local power stations of Ferrybridge, Eggborough and Drax (the biggest power station in Europe).  There are many trains, nearly always hauled by Class 66 locomotives of DB Cargo UK, Freightliner and GB Railfreight. For many years the only time the line saw passenger trains was when there were engineering diversions on the East Coast Main Line, but since May 2010 there has been a regular train service that runs on this line from Bradford Interchange to London King's Cross, run by open access operator Grand Central.

Notes

References

Body, G. (1988), PSL Field Guides - Railways of the Eastern Region Volume 2, Patrick Stephens Ltd, Wellingborough, 

Disused railway stations in North Yorkshire
Former Lancashire and Yorkshire Railway stations
Railway stations in Great Britain opened in 1848
Railway stations in Great Britain closed in 1948